Jeļizaveta Polstjanaja (born 12 March 2003) is a  Latvian rhythmic gymnast.

Career 
Born in Jurmala, Latvia, to Russian parents, she began rhythmic gymnastics at the age of 7 in Moscow, Russia. In 2018, Polstjanaja got Latvian citizenship and started competing for Latvia.

2018

Polstjanaja participated in the Junior European Championship 2018 in Guadalajara, Spain.

2019

Polstjanaja competed at the European Championshipss in Baku, Azerbaijan. Polstjanaja competed at the 2019 World Championships in Baku, Azerbaijan, placing 32nd, and did not advance to the top 24 all-around final. She also placed 26th with the Latvian team along with Alina Baklagina and Karolina Mizune.

2020

In November, Polstjanaja participated in the European Championships in Kyiv, Ukraine where she took 15th place.

Routine music information

References 

2003 births
Living people
Latvian gymnasts
Latvian rhytmic gymnasts